Garrett Liberty (born November 29, 1979) is an American professional stock car racing driver. He competed in one NASCAR Busch Series in 2004, one East Series race in 2007, and also made one NASCAR Truck Series start in 2005 (with a second attempt in 2006) and five ARCA starts (and a sixth attempt) in 2004.

Racing career
Liberty competed part-time in the ARCA Re/Max Series in 2004, attempting six races, which were at both Toledo races, Berlin, Gateway (which he wouldn't qualify for), Lake Erie, and Nashville. He drove the No. 6 Pontiac and No. 4 Ford for Andy Belmont's team in his first three races, the No. 58 Pontiac for Day Enterprise Racing in his next two, and his final start of the season came in Wayne Peterson's No. 06 Chevrolet. His best finish was a 21st at Berlin, which was the only race he was running at the finish in.

Motorsports career results

NASCAR
(key) (Bold – Pole position awarded by qualifying time. Italics – Pole position earned by points standings or practice time. * – Most laps led.)

Busch Series

Craftsman Truck Series

Busch East Series

ARCA Re/Max Series
(key) (Bold – Pole position awarded by qualifying time. Italics – Pole position earned by points standings or practice time. * – Most laps led.)

References

External links
 

1979 births
NASCAR drivers
ARCA Menards Series drivers
Living people
Racing drivers from Atlanta
Racing drivers from Georgia (U.S. state)
People from Jonesboro, Georgia